Jenolan is a rural locality in the local government area (LGA) of Oberon in the Central West region of New South Wales. The 2016 census recorded a population of 19 for the state suburb of Jenolan.

History 

The name “Jenolan Caves” was adopted in 1884. It is assumed that the locality name was derived from the caves.

Geography
The Jenolan Caves are within the locality, and the Jenolan River flows through.

Road infrastructure
Jenolan Caves Road provides access to the locality from Hartley on the Great Western Highway, and Edith Road provides access from Oberon.

References

Towns in New South Wales
Oberon Council